Trebeath is a hamlet in the parish of Egloskerry, Cornwall, England, United Kingdom.

References

External links

Hamlets in Cornwall